Daniela Cavallo (born 3 April 1975) is a German business executive who has been chairwoman of the General (Gesamtbetriebsrat) and Group Works Council (Konzernbetriebsrat) of the Volkswagen Group since May 2021.

Career
Cavallo was born to Italian parents. Her father came to Wolfsburg with the first wave of guest workers and worked at the Wolfsburg Volkswagen Plant. According to the financial news website Business Insider, her Italian origin is important to her. She feels like at home in both countries, but she is really at home in Wolfsburg. After graduating from high school in 1994, she completed an apprenticeship as an office clerk at Volkswagen and qualified as a business administrator. She was also involved in youth and trainee representation.

In 2002, Cavallo was elected to the workers council of the then Volkswagen subsidiary Auto 5000. After the birth of her children, she interrupted her work between 2004 and 2008 as the first works council member at Volkswagen for parental leave. Cavallo has been a member of the Volkswagen General Works Council since 2013. In 2019, she was elected deputy to long-term chairman of the General and Group Works Council, Bernd Osterloh. After, Osterloh became the new Chief Human Resources Officer at the Volkswagen commercial vehicle subsidiary Traton, Cavallo took over on 23 April 2021.

According to the Handelsblatt, the leap of the daughter of an Italian guest worker family to the top of the group's employee representatives is "an important moment not only for Volkswagen, but for the entire trade union movement. Because for the first time the giant Volkswagen corporation with 660,000 employees worldwide has a woman as its top employee representative". According to Die Tageszeitung and Manager Magazin, Cavallo "is now in what is probably the most powerful position on the employee side in German industry". Cavallo's predecessor Osterloh describes her as "strong leadership, empathic and so strategically thinking that many will be surprised". The head of the car manufacturer's employee representatives stood.

In a long interview with editors of the weekly newspaper Die Zeit in June 2021, Cavallo spoke about controversial high salary payments to the works councils and the effects of the Volkswagen emissions scandal. She is also concerned about xenophobic incidents at the Volkswagen Zwickau-Mosel Plant. Because of her origins as the daughter of a guest-worker, she feels particularly drawn to fighting racism and xenophobia in Volkswagen Group and to improving career opportunities for women.

See also 

 Volkswagen worker organization

References

1975 births
Living people
German people of Italian descent
Women corporate executives
Volkswagen Group executives
20th-century German businesspeople
21st-century German businesspeople
People from Wolfsburg
Works councillors